Willem Petrus Nel (born 30 April 1986) is a Scottish professional rugby union player. He plays as a prop for Edinburgh Rugby in the United Rugby Championship and represents Scotland in international rugby. He previously played for Free State Cheetahs, Western Province and the Boland Cavaliers.

Career in Scotland

Nel joined Scottish Pro 12 side Edinburgh in July 2012.

After three years at Murrayfield Stadium, Nel became eligible to represent Scotland in June 2015, and claimed he would decline an invitation to represent his native Springboks in order to do so. He made his international bow against Italy during the 2015 summer Tests, and was subsequently named in the final 31-man squad for the 2015 Rugby World Cup.

He scored his first international try in the 39–16 World Cup match against the USA.

Nel played in all of Scotland's matches in the 2016 Six Nations but missed the 2016 Autumn Internationals and the entire 2017 Six Nations due to a neck injury. This injury probably cost him a place in the Lions touring squad to New Zealand in 2017.

In March 2017 it was announced that Nel had signed a three-year extension to his contract with Edinburgh.

Nel played in four (starting three) of Scotland's group matches at the 2019 Rugby World Cup.

References

External links
 

1986 births
Living people
People from Hantam Local Municipality
Afrikaner people
South African rugby union players
Rugby union props
Cheetahs (rugby union) players
Free State Cheetahs players
Western Province (rugby union) players
Boland Cavaliers players
Edinburgh Rugby players
South African expatriate rugby union players
Expatriate rugby union players in Scotland
South African expatriate sportspeople in Scotland
Naturalised citizens of the United Kingdom
Scotland international rugby union players
Rugby union players from the Northern Cape